Dianne Elizabeth Reeves (born October 23, 1956) is an American jazz singer.

Biography 
Dianne Reeves was born in Detroit, Michigan, into a musical family. Her father sang, her mother played trumpet, her uncle is bassist Charles Burrell, and her cousin is George Duke. Her father died when she was two years old, and she was raised in Denver, Colorado, by her mother, Vada Swanson, and maternal family. She was raised Catholic and attended Cure D'Ars Catholic School in Denver for much of her early schooling.

Career 
In 1971, she started singing and playing piano. She was a member of her high-school band, and while performing at a convention in Chicago was noticed by trumpeter Clark Terry, who invited her to sing with him. "He had these amazing all-star bands, but I had no idea who they all were! The thing I loved about it was the way they interacted with each other – the kind of intimate exchange that I wasn't part of. For a young singer, it was fertile soil." She studied classical voice at the University of Colorado.

Reeves moved to Los Angeles, where she sang and recorded with Stanley Turrentine, Lenny White, and Billy Childs. She recorded with the band Caldera, then founded the band Night Flight with Billy Childs, with whom she would collaborate again in the 1990s. She moved to New York City and from 1983 to 1986 toured with Harry Belafonte.

She signed with Blue Note in 1987 and that year her eponymous album, featuring Herbie Hancock, Freddie Hubbard, and Tony Williams, was nominated for a Grammy Award. She went on to win five Grammy Awards.

Music critic Scott Yanow has said of her: "A logical successor to Dinah Washington and Carmen McRae, Reeves is a superior interpreter of lyrics and a skilled scat singer." Her sound has been compared to that of Patti Austin, Vanessa Rubin, Anita Baker, and Regina Belle.

Reeves performed at the closing ceremony of the 2002 Winter Olympics in Salt Lake City. In 2005, she appeared in the film Good Night, and Good Luck singing 1950s standards (including "How High the Moon", "I've Got My Eyes on You", "Too Close for Comfort", "Straighten Up and Fly Right" and "One for My Baby"). In 2006, the soundtrack won the Grammy Award for Best Jazz Vocal Album.

Discography 

 Welcome to My Love (Palo Alto, 1982)
 For Every Heart (TBA & Tapes, 1984)
 Ballerina with Marcy Levy (BBC, 1984)
 Dianne Reeves (Blue Note, 1987)
 The Nearness of You (Blue Note, 1988)
 Never Too Far (EMI, 1989)
 I Remember (Blue Note, 1991)
 Quiet After the Storm (Blue Note, 1994)
 Art & Survival (EMI, 1994)
 Three Ladies of Jazz: Live in New York (Jazz Door, 1995)
 The Grand Encounter (Blue Note, 1996)
 New Morning (Blue Note, 1997)
 That Day (Blue Note, 1997)
 Bridges (Blue Note, 1999)
 In the Moment – Live in Concert (Blue Note, 2000)
 The Calling: Celebrating Sarah Vaughan (Blue Note, 2001)
 A Little Moonlight (Blue Note, 2003)
 Christmas Time Is Here (Blue Note, 2004)
 Good Night, and Good Luck (Concord, Jazz, 2005)
Music For Lovers (Blue Note, 2006)
 When You Know (Blue Note, 2008)
 Beautiful Life (Concord, 2013)
 Light Up the Night: Live in Marciac (Concord, 2016)

Filmography 
 2005: Appeared as jazz singer in Good Night, and Good Luck, directed by George Clooney
 2005: Dianne Reeves "Live in Montreal" (Montreal International Jazz Festival 2000)
 2008: Dianne Reeves: The Early Years with Billy Childs and Snooky Young

Awards and honors
 Grammy Award for Best Jazz Vocal Album:
 2001: In the Moment – Live In Concert
 2002: The Calling: Celebrating Sarah Vaughan
 2004: A Little Moonlight
 2006: Good Night, and Good Luck 
 2015: Beautiful Life
 2003: Honorary doctorate, Berklee College of Music
 2015: Best Album, Jazz FM Awards, Beautiful Life
 2015: Honorary doctorate, The Juilliard School
 2018: NEA Jazz Masters

References

External links 

 
 Interview video Bamboo-music.com (English & French), March 2008. 
 Thierry Quénum, "In Conversation with Dianne Reeves", Jazz.com, June 15, 2008

 Felix Contreras, "Dianne Reeves: A Jazz Voice With Pop Sensibilities", NPR, February 1, 2011.

1956 births
20th-century African-American women singers
21st-century African-American women singers
African-American Catholics
American jazz singers
American women jazz singers
Blue Note Records artists
Grammy Award winners
Jazz musicians from Michigan
Living people
Scat singers
Singers from Detroit
Smooth jazz singers